Toromeryx is a medium-sized extinct genus of Artiodactyla, of the family Protoceratidae, endemic to southwestern North America from the Eocene epoch (Late Uintan stage) 46.2—42 Ma, existing for approximately .

Taxonomy
Toromeryx was named by Wilson (1974). Its type is Toromeryx marginensis. It was assigned to Protoceratidae by Wilson (1974), Carroll (1988), Prothero (1998) and Prothero and Ludtke (2007).

Morphology
Toromeryx resembled deer. However they were more closely related to camelids. In addition to having horns in the more usual place, protoceratids had additional, rostral horns above the orbital cavity. Toromeryx was smaller than Miocene members of Tylopoda: Paratoceras, Protoceras, and Pseudoprotoceras.

Fossil distribution
Fossils have been recovered from: 
Candelaria TMM 31281 Colmena Tuff Formation, Presidio County, Texas
Casa Blanca Site, Laredo Formation, Webb County, Texas

References

Eocene even-toed ungulates
 
Eocene mammals of North America
Fossil taxa described in 1974
Prehistoric even-toed ungulate genera